Old Hararians Sports Club is a sports club and multi-purpose stadium in Harare, Zimbabwe. The ground is also known as Old Hararians 'B' Field, it is mostly used for cricket matches, and has served as the cricket venue in Zimbabwe since its foundation.

The venue
The 'A' field adjoining the main 'B' field hosted one first-class cricket match in March 1950, when Rhodesia played Transvaal. The ground played host to an ICC Emerging Nations Tournament conducted by the International Cricket Council in 2000 and played host to five matches.

The ground underwent renovation ahead of the 2018 Cricket World Cup Qualifier. The revamps were done to make the ground suitable for hosting international matches.

At the 2018 Cricket World Cup Qualifier, during the playoff matches, Nepal gained One Day International (ODI) status following their match at the ground. On 17 March 2018, the ninth place playoff match between Papua New Guinea and Hong Kong at the Cricket World Cup Qualifier became the 4,000th ODI match to be played.

International centuries

One Day International centuries

Five-wicket hauls

One Day Internationals
Three five wicket hauls in One-Day Internationals have been taken at the venue.

See also
 List of cricket grounds by capacity
 List of One Day International cricket grounds
 List of international cricket five-wicket hauls in Zimbabwe cricket grounds § Old Hararians

References

External links
 Profile by Cricinfo

Cricket grounds in Zimbabwe
Sport in Harare
Buildings and structures in Harare